Black Mass is the fourth studio album by the American rock band This Is Hell. The album was released on October 11, 2011 through Rise Records.

Marketing and promotion
In early August 2011, a viral marketing website titled allrisefortheblackmass.com was created. The website, described as a "mysterious teaser" site for an "unknown event" in a press release, featured nothing but a countdown timer set to go off on October 11, 2011. About three weeks later on August 28, the website was revealed to be a promotion for a new album by This Is Hell titled Black Mass. The album's title track was made available for streaming online on August 31, and "Salt the Earth" was available on September 15.

This Is Hell's first tour in support of Black Mass will be a late 2011 North American tour opening for Underoath,  Comeback Kid and The Chariot.

Track listing
All songs written by This is Hell.

 "Acid Rain"
 "Black History"
 "Salt the Earth"
 "Black Mass"
 "The Wars: Part One"
 "Mi Nombre"
 "The Last Outlaw"
 "Demons"
 "The Reckoning"
 "The Wars: Part Two"

References

2011 albums
Rise Records albums
This Is Hell (band) albums